Antiochus the Great is a 1701 tragedy by the English writer Jane Wiseman. It is also known by the longer title of Antiochus the Great, or, The Fatal Relapse. It is based on the life of Antiochus the Great, the Greek ruler of Ancient Syria.

The original Lincoln's Inn Fields cast included George Powell as Antiochus the Great, John Bowman as Artenor, John Corey as Seleuchus, Barton Booth as Ormandes, George Pack as Philotas, Elizabeth Barry as Leodice, Elizabeth Bowman as Berenice  and Mary Porter as Child.

References

Bibliography
 Burling, William J. A Checklist of New Plays and Entertainments on the London Stage, 1700-1737. Fairleigh Dickinson Univ Press, 1992.
 Nicoll, Allardyce. History of English Drama, 1660-1900, Volume 2. Cambridge University Press, 2009.

1701 plays
English plays
West End plays
Tragedy plays